"Bad Reputation" is a rock song co-written and recorded by Joan Jett from her debut album of the same name. Though it was initially only released as a single in Germany, it remains one of her signature songs.

Accolades
In 2009, it was named the 29th best hard rock song of all time by VH1. It is the highest-ranked song by a woman on the list. In 2021, it was listed at No. 249 on Rolling Stone's "Top 500 Greatest Songs of All Time".

Video
A music video was made in 1982 after the huge success of "I Love Rock 'n' Roll". The video, directed by David Mallet, is a re-enactment of 23 record labels rejecting Jett's first solo album and her subsequent rise to the top of the charts with "I Love Rock 'n' Roll". Kenny Laguna, cofounder of Blackheart Records, appears in a cameo as the Warner Bros. executive.

However, the song can be heard played loudly on a jukebox in a bar at the beginning of the "I Love Rock 'n' Roll" music video.

Certifications

In popular culture
"Bad Reputation" was the opening theme to the television series Freaks and Geeks, in the romantic comedy film 10 Things I Hate About You, and was also used in the opening credits of the Discovery Channel series American Chopper.

Ronda Rousey first used the song in 2013 as her entrance music when she was Ultimate Fighting Championship's Women's Bantamweight Champion at the pay-per-view event UFC 157, and continuously used the song as her entrance music throughout her UFC career. In 2018, Rousey made her debut in WWE and would continue to use the song as her entrance music.

Jett performed the song live at WrestleMania 35 as Rousey entered the ring for her match to defend her WWE Raw Women's Championship in the first ever woman's main event at WrestleMania 35.

In the 2001 film Shrek, the song is featured in a fight scene parodying professional wrestling. While the original Jett recording is heard in the film, a cover version by Halfcocked appears on the soundtrack album.

The song was also featured in "Buried Pleasure" (season 1, episode 13 of The Cleveland Show) and the 2010 film Kick-Ass.

In 2022, the song was featured in a commercial for Folgers Coffee.

Avril Lavigne version

Background, release and composition
"Bad Reputation" is a promotional single from Canadian singer Avril Lavigne from the One Piece Film: Z soundtrack, released on 11 December 2012. The song was originally featured in a video montage interval during Lavigne's The Best Damn Tour in 2008, before appearing as bonus tracks on her fourth and fifth studio albums, Goodbye Lullaby (2011) and Avril Lavigne (2013). On 17 October 2012, it was announced that Lavigne would be contributing two songs to the One Piece Film: Z soundtrack, being "Bad Reputation" and a cover of the 2001 Nickelback song "How You Remind Me". An exclusive promotional CD single was released in Japan on 12 December 2012.

Commercial reception
"Bad Reputation" charted moderately upon release, ultimately peaking at number eight on the Billboard Japan Hot 100.

Track listings
Japan 2 tracks CD single
 "Bad Reputation"  — 2:42
 "How You Remind Me"  — 4:03

Charts

Certifications

Release history

References

1980 songs
1981 debut singles
Joan Jett songs
Songs written by Joan Jett
Comedy television theme songs
Television drama theme songs
Avril Lavigne songs
Songs written by Ritchie Cordell
Music videos directed by David Mallet (director)
Sony Music Entertainment Japan singles